Biruk Abebe (born 16 November 1969) is an Ethiopian former cyclist. He competed in two events at the 1992 Summer Olympics.

References

External links
 

1969 births
Living people
Ethiopian male cyclists
Olympic cyclists of Ethiopia
Cyclists at the 1992 Summer Olympics
Place of birth missing (living people)